Events from the year 1824 in Germany

Incumbents

Kingdoms 
 Kingdom of Prussia
 Monarch – Frederick William III of Prussia (16 November 1797 – 7 June 1840)
 Kingdom of Bavaria
 Maximilian I (1 January 1806 – 13 October 1825)
 Kingdom of Saxony
 Frederick Augustus I (20 December 1806 – 5 May 1827)
 Kingdom of Hanover
 George IV  (29 January 1820 – 26 June 1830)
 Kingdom of Württemberg
 William (30 October 1816 – 25 June 1864)

Grand Duchies 
 Grand Duke of Baden
 Louis I (8 December 1818 – 30 March 1830)
 Grand Duke of Hesse
 Louis I (14 August 1806 – 6 April 1830)
 Grand Duke of Mecklenburg-Schwerin
 Frederick Francis I– (24 April 1785 – 1 February 1837)
 Grand Duke of Mecklenburg-Strelitz
 George (6 November 1816 – 6 September 1860)
 Grand Duke of Oldenburg
 Peter I (2 July 1823 - 21 May 1829)
 Grand Duke of Saxe-Weimar-Eisenach
 Charles Frederick (14 June 1828 - 8 July 1853)

Principalities 
 Schaumburg-Lippe
 George William (13 February 1787 - 1860)
 Schwarzburg-Rudolstadt
 Friedrich Günther (28 April 1807 - 28 June 1867)
 Schwarzburg-Sondershausen
 Günther Friedrich Karl I (14 October 1794 - 19 August 1835)
 Principality of Lippe
 Leopold II (5 November 1802 - 1 January 1851)
 Principality of Reuss-Greiz
 Heinrich XIX (29 January 1817 - 31 October 1836)
 Waldeck and Pyrmont
 George II (9 September 1813 - 15 May 1845)

Duchies 
 Duke of Anhalt-Dessau
 Leopold IV (9 August 1817 - 22 May 1871)
 Duke of Brunswick
 Charles II (16 June 1815 – 9 September 1830)
 Duke of Saxe-Altenburg
 Duke of Saxe-Hildburghausen (1780–1826)  - Frederick
 Duke of Saxe-Coburg and Gotha
 Ernest I (9 December 1806 – 12 November 1826)
 Duke of Saxe-Meiningen
 Bernhard II (24 December 1803–20 September 1866)
Duke of Schleswig-Holstein-Sonderburg-Beck
Frederick William (25 March 1816 – 6 July 1825)

Events 

 May 7 – Beethoven's Symphony No. 9 (the "Choral") premieres at the Theater am Kärntnertor in Vienna. The deaf composer has to be turned around on the stage, to witness the enthusiastic audience reaction.
 German shipping company F. Laeisz of Hamburg, producer of the Flying P-Liner sailing ships, is established.
 The Kurhaus of Baden-Baden in Germany is designed by Friedrich Weinbrenner.
 Principality of Reuss-Lobenstein-Ebersdorf established

Births 

 March 12 – Gustav Kirchhoff, German physicist (d. 1887)
 March 22 – Charles Pfizer, German-American chemist, co-founder of Pfizer (d. 1906)
 March 27 – Johann Wilhelm Hittorf, German physicist (d. 1914)
 June 7 – Bernhard von Gudden, German neuroanatomist, psychiatrist (d. 1886)
 November 24 – Frederick Miller, German-born American brewer, businessman (d. 1888)

Deaths 

 January 29 – Princess Louise of Stolberg-Gedern, wife of Charles Edward Stuart (b. 1752)
 February 9 – Anne Catherine Emmerich, German Augustinian Canoness, mystic, Marian visionary, ecstatic and stigmatist (b. 1774)
 May 15 – Johann Philipp Stadion, Count von Warthausen, German statesman (b. 1763)

References

Years of the 19th century in Germany
1824 in Germany
1824 in Europe